Un is a town and a nagar panchayat in Shamli district in the Indian state of Uttar Pradesh.

Geography
It has an average elevation of 240 metres (787 feet).

Demographics
As of the 2011 Census of India, Un had a population of 15,124. Males constitute 55% of the population and females 45%. Un has an average literacy rate of 58%, lower than the national average of 59.5%: male literacy is 69%, and female literacy is 45%. In Un, 15% of the population is under 6 years of age.

References

Cities and towns in Shamli district